Neil A. Doherty is an American economist, currently the Frederick H. Ecker Professor Emeritus of Insurance and Risk Management at Wharton School of the University of Pennsylvania.

Books
Doherty's books include:
Corporate Risk Management: A Financial Exposition (McGraw-Hill, 1985)
The Financial Theory of Pricing Property-Liability Insurance Contracts (with Stephen P. D'Arcy, University of Pennsylvania, 1988)
Integrated Risk Management: Techniques and Strategies for Reducing Risk (McGraw-Hill, 2000)
At War With the Weather: Managing Large-Scale Risks in a New Era of Catastrophes (with Howard Kunreuther, Erwann O. Michel-Kerjan, Martin F. Grace, Robert W. Klein, and Mark V. Pauly, MIT Press, 2009)
The Known, the Unknown, and the Unknowable in Financial Risk Management: Measurement and Theory Advancing Practice (edited with Francis X. Diebold and Richard J. Herring, Princeton University Press, 2010)

References

Year of birth missing (living people)
Living people
University of Pennsylvania faculty
American economists